Julie Gould (born 15 February 1989) is a Welsh swimmer.

Gould was born in Beveren, Belgium. As a member of the Wales team at the 2006 Commonwealth Games, she finished 7th in the 400 m individual medley with a time of 4:51.90, and 8th in the 200 m individual medley with a time of 2:20.61.

References

External links
Personal website

Female medley swimmers
Welsh female swimmers
1989 births
Living people
Swimmers at the 2006 Commonwealth Games
Commonwealth Games competitors for Wales
People from Beveren